Lijia is a town in Linshui County, Sichuan province, China. , it administers Renhe Residential Community and six villages:
Yaowangding Village
Dajiesi Village
Guanghuading Village
Doupengshi Village
Gaofengchang Village
Jinzhuping Village

References

Township-level divisions of Sichuan
Linshui County